The 2020 United States presidential election in Kansas was held on Tuesday, November 3, 2020, as part of the 2020 United States presidential election in which all 50 states plus the District of Columbia participated. Kansas voters chose electors to represent them in the Electoral College via a popular vote, pitting the Republican Party's nominee, incumbent President Donald Trump of Florida, and running mate Vice President Mike Pence of Indiana against Democratic Party nominee, former Vice President Joe Biden of Delaware, and his running mate California Senator Kamala Harris. Kansas has six electoral votes in the Electoral College.

Although Trump won the state, Biden's 41.53 percent vote share represented the highest for a Democratic presidential nominee since 2008 — among Biden's best statewide increases of the election. His 14.65-point defeat represented the first time since 1916, and only the second time ever, that Kansas voted more Democratic than neighboring Missouri, where his margin of defeat was 15.39 points.

Biden's gains were powered by significant improvement in Kansas' suburbs and college towns: he became the first Democrat to carry Johnson County, the state's most populous and home to Overland Park and Olathe, since Woodrow Wilson in 1916; the first Democrat ever to win Riley County, anchored by the Fort Riley military installation and Kansas State University; and the first to win Shawnee County, home to the state capital of Topeka, since Bill Clinton's narrow plurality in 1992. While he didn't win Sedgwick County, the second most populous in the state and home to state's largest city Wichita, which hasn't been won by a Democrat since Lyndon B. Johnson's 1964 landslide, he slightly improved on Obama's 2008 result there and received 42.9 percent of the vote there, a 44-year high for Democrats since Jimmy Carter received 46.5 percent of the vote in 1976. This is also the first election since 1992 in which a Democratic candidate won at least 5 counties.

Per exit polls by the Associated Press, Trump's strength in Kansas came from white voters, who supported Trump by 59%–38%. White voters with college degrees, however, split even for Trump and Biden. This result included a 64% showing for Trump among Protestants and a 74% showing among other Christians. Trump's best margin was 72% in rural areas, while Biden's was 52% in suburban counties.

Primary elections

Canceled Republican primary

On September 7, 2019, the Kansas Republican Party became one of several state GOP parties to officially cancel their respective primaries and caucuses. Donald Trump's re-election  campaign and GOP officials have cited the fact that Republicans canceled several state primaries when George H. W. Bush and George W. Bush sought a second term in 1992 and 2004, respectively; and Democrats scrapped some of their primaries when Bill Clinton and Barack Obama were seeking reelection in 1996 and 2012, respectively. At its state convention held between January 31 and February 1, 2020, the state party voted to formally bind all 39 of its national pledged delegates to Trump.

Democratic primary

The Kansas Democratic primary was conducted entirely by mail. Votes were counted on May 2, 2020. Joe Biden was declared the winner.

General election

Predictions

Polling

Graphical summary

Aggregate polls

Polls

Donald Trump vs. Michael Bloomberg

Donald Trump vs. Pete Buttigieg

Donald Trump vs. Bernie Sanders

Donald Trump vs. Elizabeth Warren

Results

Results by county

Counties that flipped from Republican to Democratic
 Johnson (largest municipality: Overland Park)
 Riley (largest municipality: Manhattan)
 Shawnee (largest municipality: Topeka)

Results by congressional district
Trump won 3 of the 4 congressional districts.

Notes

Partisan clients

See also
 United States presidential elections in Kansas
 2020 United States presidential election
 2020 Democratic Party presidential primaries
 2020 Republican Party presidential primaries
 2020 United States elections

References

Further reading

External links
 
 
  (state affiliate of the U.S. League of Women Voters)
 

Kansas
2020
Presidential